The following is a list of products powered by sunlight, either directly or through electricity generated by solar panels.
 Solar air conditioning
 Solar balloon
 Solar charger
 Solar backpack
 Solar cell phone charger
 Strawberry Tree 
 Solar chimney
 Solar-powered waste compacting bin
 Solar cooker
 Solar dryer
 Solar-powered fan
 Solar furnace
 Solar inverter
 Solar keyboard
 Solar lamp
 Solar pond
 Solar road stud
 Solar street light
 Solar traffic light
 Solar Tuki
 Solar-powered flashlight
 Solar notebook
 Solar-powered calculator
 Solar-powered desalination unit
 Solar-powered pump
 Solar PV Junction box

 Solar-powered fountain
 Solar-powered radio
 Solar-powered refrigerator
 Solar-powered Stirling engine
 Solar-powered watch
 Solar-pumped laser
 Solar roadway
 Solar Spark Lighter
 Solar still
 Solar tree
 Solar vehicle
Solar balloon
 Solar boat
Tûranor PlanetSolar
 Solar bus
 Solar car
 Solar golf cart
 Solar panels on spacecraft
 Solar sail 
 Solar thermal rocket.

See also
 List of pioneering solar buildings
 List of solar thermal power stations
 List of photovoltaic power stations
 Solar power
 Solar water heater

References

Further reading 
 
 
 
 
 

Solar power